The Perlis–Langkawi Bridge (Malay: Jambatan Perlis–Langkawi) is a proposed bridge in Malaysia that would connect Kuala Perlis, in Perlis state in mainland Peninsula Malaysia to Langkawi Island in Kedah state. It would be constructed by Kumho Engineering and Construction, a Korean company. Construction would begin on November 6, 2024 and be finished by 2027 to mark the 70th anniversary of Malaysian independence. The bridge would be the longest bridge in Malaysia.

References

Proposed bridges in Malaysia